Annalisa Ceresa (born 17 March 1978) is an Italian former alpine skier who competed in the 2006 Winter Olympics.

References

External links
 

1978 births
Living people
Italian female alpine skiers
Olympic alpine skiers of Italy
Alpine skiers at the 2006 Winter Olympics
Alpine skiers of Gruppo Sportivo Esercito